Aphanius crassicaudus is an extinct species of fish in the family Cyprinodontidae. It lived in the Late Miocene in brackish and hypersaline lagoons along the northern coast of the Mediterranean Sea.

References 

crassicaudus
Prehistoric fish
Taxa_named_by_Louis_Agassiz